The Hungry Squid is 2002 animated short film by John Weldon, about a young girl whose homework and personal life is being disrupted by creatures, including a giant ravenous squid.  The film was animated using Weldon's personal style of do-it-yourself filmmaking, combining low-budget computer animation with puppets, photos and stop-motion animation in a technique he calls "digital recyclomation." The film's producer, Marcy Page, had coined the term "recyclomation" during production of Weldon's 1991 film, The Lump.

This National Film Board of Canada production received seven awards, including the Genie Award for Best Animated Short and the Platinum Award at the WorldFest-Houston International Film Festival. The film is narrated by Derek McGrath.

References

External links
Watch The Hungry Squid at NFB.ca

2002 films
National Film Board of Canada animated short films
Films directed by John Weldon
Stop-motion animated short films
Best Animated Short Film Genie and Canadian Screen Award winners
2000s animated short films
2002 animated films
2000s Canadian films